The Teckman Mystery is a 1954 British mystery film directed by Wendy Toye and starring Margaret Leighton, John Justin, Roland Culver and Michael Medwin. It was shot at Shepperton Studios with sets designed by the art director William Kellner. Location shooting took place around London including in Kensington, Belgravia, Northolt Aerodrome and Tower Bridge. It was distributed by British Lion.

Plot
A biographer researching a book on a pilot who died during the test flight of a new plane falls in love with the pilot's sister. As he uncovers more about the test flight, people connected with the case begin to die. The author naturally becomes nervous, until two Scotland Yard inspectors take on the case.

Cast

 Margaret Leighton as Helen Teckman
 John Justin as Philip Chance
 Roland Culver as Major Harris
 Michael Medwin as Martin Teckman
 George Coulouris as Andrew Garvin
 Duncan Lamont as Inspector Hilton
 Raymond Huntley as Maurice Miller
 Jane Wenham as Ruth Wade
 Meier Tzelniker as John Rice
 Harry Locke as Leonard
 Frances Rowe as Eileen Miller
 Barbara Murray as Girl on plane
 Irene Lister as Waitress
 Gwen Nelson as Daily woman
 Mary Grant as B.E.A. Clerk
 Andreas Malandrinos as Waiter 
 Dan Cressey as 	Drake
 Peter Taylor as Leroy
 Warwick Ashton as 	Sgt. Blair
 Ben Williams as 1st Beefeater
 Frank Webster as 	2nd Beefeater
 Peter Augustine as 	Man with pipe
 Maurice Lane as 	GPO messenger
 Mollie Palmer as Air hostess
 Bruce Beeby as Wallace
 Gordon Morrison as 	Boris

Critical reception
The New York Times wrote, "an obvious fly-by-night, with a pretty good cast headed by the gifted Margaret Leighton and John Justin, this Associated Artists release is a slow, contrived and exasperatingly arch puzzler that sets some sort of record for meandering banality". The Radio Times called the film a "passable thriller" with "more than a hint of The Third Man."

References

External links

1954 films
1950s mystery films
British black-and-white films
British Lion Films films
British mystery films
Films based on television series
Films directed by Wendy Toye
Films scored by Clifton Parker
Films set in London
Films shot in London
Films shot at Shepperton Studios
1950s English-language films
1950s British films